Spiralinella spiralis is a species of sea snail, a marine gastropod mollusk in the family Pyramidellidae, the pyrams and their allies.

Nomenclature
Høisæter (2014) advocated using the well-known specific name spiralis (Montagu, 1803) for this species, although Turbo spiralis Montagu, 1803 is a primary homonym of Turbo spiralis Poiret, 1801. The latter name could meet the conditions for being declared nomen oblitum but so far Høisæter (2014) did not provide the citations required by ICZN Art. 23.9 to make the declaration effective.

Distribution
This marine species occurs in the following locations:
 Belgian Exclusive Economic Zone
 British Isles
 European waters (ERMS scope)
 Goote Bank
 Irish Exclusive economic Zone
 Portuguese Exclusive Economic Zone
 Spanish Exclusive Economic Zone
 United Kingdom Exclusive Economic Zone
 West Coast of Norway
 Wimereux

References

  Høisæter, T. (2014). The Pyramidellidae (Gastropoda, Heterobranchia) of Norway and adjacent waters. A taxonomic review. Fauna norvegica. 34: 7-78

External links
 To CLEMAM
 To Encyclopedia of Life
 To Marine Species Identification Portal
 To World Register of Marine Species

Pyramidellidae
Gastropods described in 1803